Corte de' Cortesi con Cignone is a comune in the province of Cremona, in Lombardy, northern Italy.

The town has a parish church, San Giacomo e Filippo.

References